Hugh Paul Seagrim,  (24 March 1909 – 22 September 1944), nicknamed "Grandfather Longlegs", was a British Indian Army officer notable for his leadership of Karen rebels in fighting Japanese invaders in Burma during the Second World War.

Seagrim's brother was Derek Seagrim, a recipient of the Victoria Cross. He and his brother have the distinction of being the only siblings awarded the Victoria Cross and the George Cross, both posthumously.

Early life and military career
Seagrim was born in Ashmansworth, Hampshire, England, on 24 March 1909. He was educated at Norwich School, graduated from the Royal Military College, Sandhurst, and joined the British Indian Army, becoming an officer in the 19th Hyderabad Regiment. He was later seconded to the 20th Burma Rifles with the temporary rank of major, becoming an expert in several Burmese languages. When the Japanese invaded Burma, he was given the task of raising irregular guerrilla forces from the Karens and other groups.

The British were driven from Burma by May 1942, and Seagrim and his force were isolated for a long time. Eventually Force 136 dropped agents and wireless operators who made contact with his guerrillas in October 1943.

Seagrim led Karens in a campaign of sabotage against the occupation. His force enjoyed much support from Karen civilians despite a series of brutal Japanese reprisal killings against Karen villages. His force was gradually wiped out by a concentrated Japanese manhunt. To prevent further bloodshed Seagrim surrendered himself to the Japanese forces on 15 March 1944. He and eight of his Karen companions were executed by the Japanese on 22 September 1944 in Rangoon. For gallantry under captivity, he was posthumously awarded the George Cross in 1946.

George Cross citation

Seagrim's George Cross citation appeared in the London Gazette on 12 September 1946:

Notes

References

Sources
 Allen, Louis, Burma: The Longest War (Orion Publishing, 2000)
 Davies, Philip, Lost Warriors: Seagrim and Pagani's Burma: The Last Great Untold Story of WWII (Atlantic Publishing, 2017)
 Morrison, Ian, Grandfather Longlegs: The Life and Gallant Death of Major H.P. Seagrim (Faber & Faber, 1947)

External links
"Karen Remember a World War II Hero", karennews.org. Originally published in The Washington Post, 15 August 2015.
 "Searching for Burma's forgotten World War Two heroes", bbc.com.
 "One Thousand Miles to Freedom, by [Mark Felton describing the extraordinary story of British NCO Roy Pagani who met and served Maj Seagrim"

1909 births
1944 deaths
Military personnel from Hampshire
People from Ashmansworth
People educated at Norwich School
British Indian Army officers
British recipients of the George Cross
Companions of the Distinguished Service Order
Indian Army personnel killed in World War II
20th-century executions by Japan
Graduates of the Royal Military College, Sandhurst
Executed people from Hampshire